Tannhäuser was a legendary medieval German Minnesänger and poet.

Tannhäuser can also refer to:

Tannhäuser (opera), an 1845 opera by Richard Wagner
Tannhäuser (novel), an 1877 Danish novel by Holger Drachmann
Tannhäuser (board game), a French war board game

See also
Tannhauser Gate